A Young Person's Guide is a double album release from Canadian composer Kyle Bobby Dunn. It was recorded over a period of six years in Greensboro, North Carolina, Calgary, Alberta, Cypress Hills, Saskatchewan, and parts of New York and New Jersey.

The album is largely made up of minimal compositions crafted and produced by processed classical instruments, electric guitar and piano. Most songs surpass the 10-minute mark in long droning suites with two shorter piano-led vignettes that balance out the second disc. Some sounds seem to be gathered from natural elements, static, old video or television dialogues, and other quiet samples.

Four pieces from the beginning of the album were released in April 2009 as a digital download from the Brooklyn label Moodgadget.

Critical reception

The album was generally praised by critics. Ned Raggett, writing for Allmusic, stated:

Delusions of Adequacy music journalists, Mark Lesseraux and Greg Argo, rewarded the album by writing:

Peter Van Cooten heavily praised the album – expressing an emotionality that separated it largely from other guitar and drone based musics. He wrote,

Tobias Fischer of Tokafi Magazine relished the album with compliments and praise:

Star's End, reveled in the album with:

Indie rock webzine, Tome to the Weather Machine, also rated the album highly, reviewing:

Track listing
Disc One
"Butel"	- 17:30		
"The Tributary (For Voices Lost)" – 10:38
"There Is No End (To Your Beauty)" – 14:34
"Promenade" – 9:08
"Small Show of Hands" – 4:12

Disc Two
"Grab (And Its Lost Legacies)" – 11:34
"Empty Gazing" – 6:53
"Last Minute Jest" – 2:03
"The Second Ponderosa" – 9:11
"Bonaventure's Finest Hour" – 10:55
"Sets of Four (Its Meaning Is Deeper Than Its Title Implies)" – 4:55
"The Nightjar" – 11:17

External links & reviews
 Review; "Highly Evolved"
 Review; "Soundscaping"
 Review; "Tome to the Weather Machine"
 Review; "Just Press Play"
 Canadian Audiophile Review — written by Jordan Richardson
 ATTN Magazine review by Jack Chuter
 Igloo Mag Low Point Label Review

References

2010 albums
Kyle Bobby Dunn albums
Concept albums